Holy Terror may refer to:

Music
 Holy Terror (album), a funk/spoken word album by The Last Poets
 Holy Terror (band), a thrash metal band formed by Kurt Colfelt of Agent Steel
 Holy Terror, the name given to the music played by the band Integrity

Literature
 Holy Terror (graphic novel), a 2011 graphic novel by Frank Miller
 Batman: Holy Terror, an Elseworlds one-shot from DC Comics
 Les Enfants Terribles (The Holy Terrors) a 1929 novel by Jean Cocteau, translated with this English title in 1955
 The Holy Terror (Goodman novel), a 1959 novel within Paul Goodman's The Empire City epic novel tetralogy
 The Holy Terror (Wells novel), a 1939 novel by H.G. Wells
 The Holy Terror (short story collection), a 1932 Simon Templar novel by Leslie Charteris
 Rifts (role-playing game) Dimension Book 1: Wormwood has a playable Holy Terror Racial Character Class

Film and television
 Holy Terror, an alternative title for the 1976 horror film Alice, Sweet Alice
 The Holy Terror (1929 film), an Our Gang short
 The Holy Terror (1937 film), directed by James Tinling 
 The Holy Terror (1965 film), a Hallmark Hall of Fame TV film

Radio
 The Holy Terror (audio drama), an audio drama based on the TV show Doctor Who

Boats
 Holy Terror, houseboat built at the shipyard of James Lenox for William Gillette

Politics
 Holy Terror, capitalised political term used in book of same name by Amir Taheri 1987